Safaitic ( Al-Ṣafāʾiyyah) is a variety of the South Semitic scripts used by the nomads of the basalt desert of southern Syria and northern Jordan, the so-called Ḥarrah, to carve rock inscriptions in various dialects of Old Arabic and Ancient North Arabian. The Safaitic script is a member of the Ancient North Arabian (ANA) sub-grouping of the South Semitic script family, the genetic unity of which has yet to be demonstrated.

Geographical distribution
Safaitic inscriptions are named after the area where they were first discovered in 1857: As-Safa, a region of basalt desert to the southeast of Damascus, Syria.  Since then they have been found over a wide area including south Syria, eastern Jordan and northwestern Saudi Arabia.  Isolated examples occur further afield in places such as Palmyra in Syria, in Lebanon, in Wadi Hauran in western Iraq, and in Ha'il in north central Saudi Arabia.  The largest concentration appears to be in the Harrat al-Shamah, a black basalt desert, stretching south and east from Jabal al-Druze through Jordan and into Saudi Arabia.  Approximately 30,000 inscriptions have been recorded, although doubtless many hundreds of thousands more remain undiscovered due to the remoteness and inhospitable nature of the terrain in which they are found.  Typically the inscriptions are found on the rocks and boulders of the desert scatter, or on the stones of cairns.  In many cases it is unclear whether the inscriptions on the cairns pre- or post-date the construction of the cairns.

A small number of Safaitic inscriptions have been found outside the Harrat al-Sham, including examples from Palmyra, the Hejaz, Lebanon, and Pompeii.

Script
The Safaitic alphabet comprises 28 letters.  Several abecedaries (lists of the alphabet) are known, but all are written in different orders, giving strength to the suggestion that the script was casually learned rather than taught systematically.

The Safaitic script exhibits considerable variability in letter shapes and writing styles.  The inscriptions can be written in nearly any direction and there are no word dividers.  There are two primary variants of the script: normal and square.  The normal variant exhibits a large degree of variation, depending on the hand of individual authors and writing instrument.  The square script appears to be a deliberate stylistic variant, making use of more angular forms of the letters.  Inscriptions rarely employ the square variants consistently, but mix these shapes with normal letter forms.  Finally, a minority of inscriptions exhibit a mix of Safaitic and Hismaic letter shapes.

Letters

Language 

The linguistic classification of the dialects expressed by the Safaitic script continues to be debated.  The traditional view held that because the Safaitic inscriptions often make use of the definite article ha-, in contrast to Classical Arabic 'al, that their language should not be regarded as Arabic proper, but rather as Ancient North Arabian.  However, as more inscriptions have come to light, it is clear that the Safaitic dialects make use of a variety of definite article forms, including 'al, and even a simple 'a-.  Based on this fact, the competing view holds that the dialects attested in the Safaitic script represent a linguistic continuum, on which Classical Arabic and other older forms of the language lie.

Content
Most Safaitic inscriptions are graffiti that reflect the current concerns of the author: the availability of grazing for his camel herd, mourning the discovery of another inscription by a person who has since died, or simply listing his genealogy and stating that he made the inscription.  Others comment on raids and pray for booty, or mention religious practices.  A few inscriptions by female authors are known.  Inscriptions are sometimes accompanied by rock art, showing hunting or battle scenes, camels and horses and their riders, bedouin camp scenes, or occasional female figures.

References

Further reading
 
 
 King, G. (1990) "The Basalt Desert Rescue Survey and some preliminary remarks on the Safaitic inscriptions and rock drawings" Proceedings of the Seminar for Arabian Studies 20:55-78
 Macdonald, M. C. A. (1992)  "Inscriptions, Safaitic" in The Anchor Bible Dictionary Vol 3 (editor in chief D N Freedman) Doubleday
 Macdonald, M. C. A. (2000) "Reflections on the linguistic map of pre-Islamic Arabia" Arabian Archaeology and Epigraphy 11(1):28–79
 Oxtoby, W. G. (1968) Some Inscriptions of the Safaitic Bedouin  American Oriental Society, Oriental Series 50.  New Haven, Connecticut
 Winnett, F. V. and Harding, G. L. (1978) Inscriptions  from Fifty Safaitic Cairns  Toronto

External links

Online Corpus of the Inscriptions of Ancient North Arabia (OCIANA)

Arabic languages
Arab groups
Ancient history of Jordan
History of Saudi Arabia
Ancient Syria
Ancient North Arabian